Richland is an unincorporated community located within Buena Vista Township in Atlantic County, New Jersey, United States. The area is served as United States Postal Service ZIP Code 08350.

As of the 2010 United States Census, the population for ZIP Code Tabulation Area (ZCTA) 08350 was 825.

The Cape May Seashore Lines operates passenger rail service from Richland to Tuckahoe, from a scale reproduction of the original Richland Station, which was removed in the mid-1960s.

Mojito, New Jersey
On April 26, 2004, the Buena Vista Township Committee voted to temporarily rename the community of Richland, a section of Buena Vista Township. For the first half of the month of May 2004, Richland became Mojito, New Jersey, named after the Cuban rum drink. Bacardi had offered to give the township $5,000 for recreation projects in exchange for commemorating the new name with a sign on U.S. Route 40 for those weeks. Richland was chosen because it is home to the family-run Dalponte Farms, a major East Coast supplier of mint, an essential ingredient of the mojito.

Demographics

Education
Founded in 1959, St. Augustine Preparatory School is an all-male Catholic high school, operated within the Roman Catholic Diocese of Camden.

Attractions
 Cape May Seashore Lines
 Patcong Valley Railroad Museum

References

External links

 Mojito cocktails

Buena Vista Township, New Jersey
Unincorporated communities in Atlantic County, New Jersey
Unincorporated communities in New Jersey